Aaron John Harrison Heap (born 14 May 2000) is a professional footballer who plays for Banbury United, as a midfielder. Born in England, he represented Northern Ireland at youth international level.

Club career
Heap began his career with Kidlington, signing on a scholarship for Oxford United in April 2016. He made his senior debut on 6 November 2018, in the EFL Trophy. He signed a new contract in April 2019 when Oxford activated a six-month option in his contract.

On 1 November 2019, Heap joined North Leigh on a month's loan. At the end of November 2019 it was reported that Heap would leave Oxford in January 2020 when his contract expired. He then continued to play for North Leigh in 2020, until he was signed by Banbury United at the end of August 2020.

International career
He made his debut with the Northern Ireland under-19 team in 2018. He is also eligible to represent Wales. Heap was called up to a training camp with the Wales U21s in March 2019.

Career statistics

References

2000 births
Living people
People from Oxfordshire
People from Northern Ireland of Welsh descent
English people of Northern Ireland descent
English people of Welsh descent
Association footballers from Northern Ireland
English footballers
Association football midfielders
Northern Ireland youth international footballers
Oxford United F.C. players
North Leigh F.C. players
Banbury United F.C. players